Six Years Home is the debut studio album by Italian post-hardcore band Hopes Die Last. It was released on August 4, 2009, through Standby Records. It includes a re-recorded version of "Call Me Sick Boy" from their EP Your Face Down Now, and nine other tracks.

Track listing

Personnel
Six Year Home album personnel as listed on Allmusic.
Hopes Die Last
Daniele Tofani - unclean vocals
Marco Mantovani - lead guitar, backing vocals
Luigi Magliocca - rhythm guitar
Marco "Becko" Calanca - bass, clean vocals, keyboard, programming
Ivan Panella - drums, percussion

 Composers
Daniele Tofani - composer on Consider Me Alive
Marco Mantovani - composer on all songs except Consider Me Alive
Jacopo Iannariello  - composer on Good Mourning, Honey (Former guitarist, 2004–2008)

Production
Produced, mixed, additional keyboard, programming & vocals by Daniele Brian Autore
Engineered & mastered by Vincenzo Mario Cristi

References

2009 albums
Hopes Die Last albums